Nouveau riche refers to a social class.

Nouveau Riche may also refer to:

 Nouveau Riche (Philadelphia band)
 Nouveau Riche (Swedish band)
 Nouveau Riche (college), a defunct, unaccredited real estate investment college